The 2017 Liberty Flames football team represented Liberty University in the 2017 NCAA Division I FCS football season. They were led by sixth-year head coach Turner Gill and played their home games at Williams Stadium. They were a member of the Big South Conference. They finished the season 6–5, 2–3 in Big South play to finish in fourth place.

The school owned by Jerry Falwell Jr. announced plans to undergo the two-year transition period join the Division I FBS as a football independent, while remaining in the Big South Conference in all other sports. While normally against NCAA rules to transition to FBS without a conference invite, Liberty was granted a waiver.

Schedule 

 Source: Schedule

Game summaries

at Baylor

Morehead State

Indiana State

at Jacksonville State

Saint Francis (PA)

Kennesaw State

at Monmouth

at Gardner–Webb

Duquesne

Presbyterian

at Charleston Southern

Ranking movements 

* Due to their transition to FBS, they are not eligible to be ranked in the FCS Coaches Poll.

References

Liberty
Liberty Flames football seasons
Liberty Flames football